Jack Snyder is a character on the American soap opera As the World Turns. He was portrayed by actor Michael Park from April 1, 1997 until the final episode on September 17, 2010.

Character history
Jack Snyder came to Oakdale in 1997 to investigate James Stenbeck. After helping to put Stenbeck behind bars, he decided to stay in town and got a job at the Oakdale PD. Jack also got reacquainted with his family and helped his cousin, Holden Snyder, in the search for his daughter. Not long after arriving in town, Jack went with Holden to Montana. There he met his rival, Carly Tenney. Jack and Carly didn't get along at first; in fact they couldn't stand each other. However, despite all their arguing, there was much chemistry between them. Their true feelings for each other became apparent when they investigated arsonist/dirty cop Teague. During the investigation, Jack and Carly got trapped in a cabin where they grew closer and discovered that they had feelings for one another. After returning to Oakdale, Jack wanted to continue the relationship slowly; however Carly was desperate to get married and she dumped Jack to marry Hal Munson.

Reeling from his breakup with Carly, Jack was all set to leave town when he met Julia Lindsey. While helping Julia escape from her controlling fiancé, he fell in love with her. In the meantime, Jack found out the truth about Carly's marriage to Hal—she would inherit a huge trust fund from her sister, Rosanna Cabot, if she married a man and had a baby by him by the time the year was out. Disgusted, Jack told Carly to come clean with Hal or he'd completely walk out of her life. In the end, Hal learned the truth himself and divorced her. Luckily for Carly, she got Dr. John Dixon (who she thought impregnated her with donated sperm) to marry her and, soon after, with the assistance of Jack and Julia, she gave birth to a son, Parker in December 1998. Soon after, Jack's relationship with Julia ended when he learned that she lied to him about killing David Stenbeck, and also because of interference from Carly. Even though Jack tried to avoid Carly and deny his feelings for her, something about her kept pulling him back. Eventually, long buried feelings rose to the surface and they made love. He dumped Carly again, soon after, when he found out that she lied about her son's paternity, Hal not John was the baby's father.

On one occasion, Carly was kidnapped and taken to another country. Jack fought to find her and get her back. She was given a serum that would age her quickly, so by the time she was rescued she had aged quite a bit. But that didn't stop Jack, who held a reluctant Carly in his arms, caring for what was inside more than out. Carly wasn't so embarrassed and let Jack love her. Eventually, Carly was given a reverse serum that brought her looks back to where they were when she left. Jack treated her no different, and she felt safe and secure in his arms.

The night before Jack and Carly were going to get married, they had a huge argument over her relationship with Craig Montgomery. Jack didn't approve of them spending so much time together. Carly was angry when she left, and went to her office and started drinking to calm herself. Mike Kasnoff showed up while Carly was drinking. As they sat there and talked, Carly found comfort in Mike's arms. They made love. The next day, Jack and Carly made up but she never told him about the affair - until she had to. Carly found herself pregnant, but she wasn't sure if it was Mike's baby or Jack's. She went to Montana to get away. Jack followed her, just in time to help with the birth. Carly had a little girl who she named Sage. They renewed their vows and found out later that Sage was Jack's.

Carly's cousin Molly Conlan was in town. She had a mobster chasing her. When he was caught at Jack and Carly's house, Jack came to arrest him. He called for back up, but Molly was so upset at his presence that she insisted that Jack take him out of the house. Jack decided to take him in his car. Carly begged him not to, but he couldn't bear to see Molly upset. On the way to the police department, Jack's car went over the bridge. Jack's body was not in the car. Everyone gave up on the search eventually, but not Carly. She searched until she found Jack. He had amnesia and was married to a woman who was the nurse who took care of him in the hospital. Julia had a son named JJ and they were one big happy family. Carly got Jack to come back to Oakdale, and once he was there, she had him court ordered to live with her instead of Julia. Jack was torn. He finally got his memory back and let Julia down easy. She sought comfort in his cousin, Holden. Carly and Jack were glad to have things back to normal. Tragically, Julia was killed by her ex-husband and JJ was awarded to Jack, since he was the only "real dad" he knew.

Jack and Carly finally divorced in 2006, and after grieving for a while, Carly found herself falling in love with Simon Frasier. The two got into trouble and Jack had to arrest them both. After a struggle, Simon and Carly got away, and Jack took the kids to the farm to stay.

Jack and Katie began dating and he quickly fell for the bubbly blonde. Carly returned to town, putting a wrench in the works and then JJ was kidnapped. Together, Jack and Carly tracked down JJ and brought him home; along the way, Jack began having feelings for Carly again. Nearly unconscious after an explosion, he said, "I love you, Carly," within Katie's hearing (Carly wasn't there). When they returned to Oakdale, Jack decided to put the past behind him and proposed to Katie! Katie accepted and Jack rushed the wedding forward and they were married in a few days.

Just after the wedding, Jack got devastating news: Carly was dying from a brain lesion! He put his life - and his honeymoon - on hold to care for her! Jack was falling for Carly again and asked her to marry him. On the day of their wedding, Carly told him that she was misdiagnosed and had lied about it. He left her at the altar but it was too late to save his relationship with Katie.

He took the kids from Carly and tried to leave her in his past. Janet Ciccone arrived in town and began an affair with Jack. The closer they got, though, the more Jack realized his feelings for Carly weren't in the past. Around this time he learned of Carly's affair with Holden and was livid. Rather than focus on Carly, though, Jack tried to save Parker from a bad relationship with Liberty Ciccone - and a livid Brad! When Brad accused Parker of raping Liberty, Jack and Carly pulled together to clear their son. At Alison and Aaron's wedding, Jack and Carly talked about the past but neither could admit they still had feelings for one another. Janet realized that Jack's feelings weren't in the past and moved out of the farm.

Reception
For portraying Jack Snyder, Michael Park won two Daytime Emmy Awards for Outstanding Lead Actor in a Drama Series in 2010 and 2011 respectively.

References

See also
Jack Snyder and Carly Tenney

As the World Turns characters
Television characters introduced in 1997
Male characters in television
Fictional American police detectives